Ethylenediamine pyrocatechol (EDP), also known as ethylenediamine-pyrocatechol-water (EPW), is an anisotropic etchant solution for silicon. A typical formulation consists of ethylenediamine, pyrocatechol, pyrazine and water.  It is carcinogenic and very corrosive. It is mainly used in research labs, and is not used in mainstream semiconductor fabrication processes.

References
Microfabrication:Wet-Etching, University of Washington, College of Engineering

Polyamines
Catechols